Flavocrambus melaneurus is a moth in the family Crambidae. It was described by George Hampson in 1919. It is found in India (Punjab).

References

Crambinae
Moths described in 1919